Ira Liston Pierce (September 1874 – July 16, 1906) was an American chemist and college sports coach. He served as the head baseball coach of the University of Delaware in 1895 and as football coach in 1896.

Pierce was born in September 1874 and grew up in Wilmington, Delaware. He attended Wilmington High School, and after graduating from there, attended the University of Delaware. He graduated from the University of Delaware with a master's degree in science, and later served as a chemistry instructor at the school. After retiring from there, he became a chemist in Gibbstown, New Jersey.

While at the University of Delaware, he also coached their baseball team in 1895, and their football team in 1896, going winless in six games in football.

Pierce was killed in an explosion at the Atlantic Dynamite Company, where he worked as a superintendent, on July 16, 1906. His funeral was held on July 20.

Head coaching record

Football

References

External links
 

1874 births
1906 deaths
American chemists
Delaware Fightin' Blue Hens baseball coaches
Delaware Fightin' Blue Hens football coaches
University of Delaware alumni
University of Delaware faculty
Sportspeople from Wilmington, Delaware
Coaches of American football from Delaware
Baseball coaches from Delaware
Accidental deaths in Wisconsin
Industrial accident deaths